Franklin Middle School is the name of many middle schools, usually named after Benjamin Franklin, including:

Franklin Middle School (Long Beach, California)
Franklin Middle School (Vallejo, California)
Franklin Middle School (Pocatello, Idaho)
Franklin Middle School (Champaign, Illinois)
Franklin Middle School (Springfield, Illinois)
Franklin Middle School (Wheaton, Illinois)
Franklin Middle School (Baltimore, Maryland)
Franklin Middle School (Cedar Rapids, Iowa)
Franklin Middle School (Nutley, New Jersey)
Franklin Middle School (Franklin Township, New Jersey)
Franklin Middle School (Somerset, New Jersey)
Franklin Middle School (Dallas, Texas)
Franklin Middle School (Chantilly, Virginia)
Franklin Middle School (Yakima, Washington)
Franklin Middle School (Green Bay, Wisconsin)
Franklin Middle School (Janesville, Wisconsin)
Franklin Middle School(Wayne, Michigan)